Manchester North East may refer to:

 Manchester North East (UK Parliament constituency)
 Manchester North Eastern (Jamaica Parliament constituency)